Highway 31 is an inter-city highway in southern Israel. It begins at Zohar junction south of Neve Zohar, where it meets Highway 90 just west of the Dead Sea. It passes through Arad, Kuseife, Hura, Lakiya and Lehavim, and it terminates at HaNasi junction near Eshel HaNasi.

As of 2001, the western terminus of Highway 31 was Lehavim junction and the intersection with Highway 40. The portion of the road west of this junction has opened to traffic after 2001. 

There are plans to upgrade the highway to two lanes in each direction.

Junctions & Interchanges on the highway

Gallery

Hazardous road

Road 31, nicknamed road of death had been declared a red road (a road that has more than average number of fatal accidents) by both Or Yarok and the Israeli police.
The road had an average of 2 fatal accidents per month between 2011 and 2013, and had a total of 87 dead and 1399 wounded up until 2015.

References

See also
 List of highways in Israel

31